Barraba  is a town in the New England region of northern New South Wales, Australia.  It was formerly the centre of Barraba Shire local government area, but most of this, including Barraba, was absorbed into Tamworth Regional Council in 2004. On Census night 2016, Barraba had a population of approximately 1,400 people. It is part of the Bundarra-Barraba Important Bird Area which is important for the conservation of the endangered regent honeyeater.

The town was the termination point for the Barraba branch railway line until it was closed.

History

The Kamilaroi people lived and occupied the Barraba region prior to European settlement. The first white man in area was the explorer and botanist, Allan Cunningham, in 1827.  At the same time, he discovered the Manilla River, which he named Buddle's Creek. A land holding named Barraba Station was taken up around 1837 or 1838. In July 1852, the Assistant Surveyor, J. T.
Gorman mapped the future townsite.

During the 1850s, gold rushes in the region helped the growth of the township. On 1 April 1856, the first Barraba Post Office opened, with a brick post office built in 1882. A school followed, opening in 1861, in rented premises. In September 1876, there was an auction of the crown lands in Barraba. In the same year, the first St Laurence's church building was built, as well as the first bank. In 1878, the Commercial Hotel was built, and three years later, the Barraba Court House was built. On 20 March 1885, Barraba was proclaimed a town.
During the 1890s, many more key buildings of the township were built, including the hospital (1891) and the Weslyan Church (1898). In 1893, the population in Barraba reached 500; this increased to 1,164 in 1921.

A local newspaper, the Barraba Gazette was first published in 1900, but closed 8 April 2020 and was replaced by a section dedicated to Barraba news in the Manilla Express newspaper. The last section of the Barraba railway line from Manilla to Barraba opened on 21 September 1908 without a ceremony. The last train to Barraba ran on 21 September 1983, with the majority of the line closing on 25 November 1987. During 1933, Connors Creek dam was constructed as a water supply for the town.

Mining

Copper

In 1889, Copper was discovered at Gulf Creek, near Barraba and the first mine was established there in 1892. After mining had commenced, a village sprung up, which included a hotel, school and a post office. The Gulf Creek Post Office opened on 1 August 1897 and closed on 28 February 1966. At its peak, in 1901, the copper mine was one of the largest in the state. In July of that year, there were around 300 people living in the village.

Woodsreef asbestos mining and aftermath

Chrysotile asbestos was mined at Woodsreef, on a site of 400 hectares also near Barraba, from 1919 to the 1980s. The Chrysotile Corporation of Australia carried out large-scale mining at the site from 1970 to 1983. The open-cut mine produced approximately 500,000 tonnes of chrysotile, or white asbestos, from 100 million tonnes of mined material.

The mine closure left a 75-million tonne waste rock dump covering an area of approximately 117 hectares. A 25-million tonne tailings dump also remains, covering approximately 43 hectares. This tailings stockpile has an average height of 45 metres, reaching a maximum height of 70 metres.

On 13 August 2008, an episode of The 7.30 Report described growing concern that the waste left by the derelict mine could pose a health risk to locals and passing tourists. The Asbestos Diseases Foundation of Australia  called for an urgent clean-up of the site and a ban on members of the public going anywhere near it. A public dirt road did pass through the site until it was closed in December 2013.

The 7.30 Report story led to Hunter New England Health being directed to undertake an urgent study of the health implications for the Barraba community. This report has been completed but not released, despite the efforts of the Northern Daily Leader and the ABC to have its findings made public.

In 2011, the NSW State Government provided funding of $6.3 million to undertake major rehabilitation of the mine to address the most significant health, safety and environmental issues. These works included:

 containment of processed friable chrysotile asbestos
 removal of the former mill building, silos, and administration buildings
 implementation of a comprehensive air quality monitoring program and health risk assessment before, during and following remediation works
 closure of the nearby road.

Climate and weather

The weather station at Barraba Post Office was opened firstly as a rain reporting station in March 1881. It became a full weather station in March 1966, with readings made by a human observer. The position of the weather station behind the post office may have led to incorrect weather data.

Notable weather extremes

A number of notable or significant weather events have affected the town over the years. These include:
 1898 – The first known snowstorm to hit the town was reported.
 7 October 1907 – During the afternoon, a hailstorm passed through the town.
 6 February 1915 – A severe thunderstorm passed close to the town, affecting properties in the area. It dumped 3 inches of rain in about half an hour, and damaging winds (described as 'cyclonic winds') brought down trees, destroyed sheds and damage to houses.
 25 February 1955 – The highest daily rainfall total of 194.3 mm was recorded.
 3 July 1984 – The lowest recorded maximum temperature of 5.8 °C was recorded.
 July 1984 – The second known snowstorm to hit the town was reported.
 2018 to 2020 - The fourth major drought which has affected farmers and the split rock dam lowered its water levels

Water supply
Prior to the construction of the Split Rock Dam Pipeline, the water supply for the town was usually taken from the Manilla River, the Barraba Creek and Connors Creek Dam. When these sources dwindle, Barraba depends on emergency bores.

Approval was given in 2012 for the construction of the pipeline from Split Rock Dam.  The dam, which was built in 1988, already had a draw valve in the wall in preparation for the pipeline to Barraba.  The pipeline and associated capital works were completed in December 2015.

Barraba Community Development Committee
The Barraba Community Development Committee is a 355 committee of Tamworth Regional Council. This community group has lobbied local, state and federal governments on a number of issues including the Pipeline from Split Rock Dam to Barraba, Woodsreef Mine Rehabilitation and continues to be an effective liaison between the community and Tamworth Regional Council.

Notable residents
 Bill Bright - harpsichord maker 
 Clive Crowley – soldier
 Grace Crowley – artist
 Shaun Faulkner – winner of the fourth season of The Mole in 2003
 Rupert Richardson – artist who among other things collaborated on the decoration of Bright's harpsichords 
 Cassie Batten (Burrows)- Activist  for medicinal cannabis,  achieved laws to be changed for her epileptic son in Victoria. Also the cousin of Shaun Faulkner, winner of The Mole 2003
 Andrew Farriss - INXS founding band member, singer/songwriter, country singer

References

External links
Barraba NSW
Historical Land Records Viewer – NSW Department of Lands – after accepting terms, enter barraba to view old maps of Barraba.

Towns in New South Wales
Towns in New England (New South Wales)
Populated places established in the 1830s
1830s establishments in Australia
Tamworth Regional Council
Mining towns in New South Wales